The 1962 Women's Amateur Snooker Championship was an amateur snooker tournament held in May 1962 at Burroughes Hall. Maureen Barrett successfully defended her title, defeating Rita Holmes 4–1 in the final.

Main Draw

References

1962 in snooker
Snooker amateur tournaments